Nigel Boston (born July 20, 1961) is a British-American mathematician, who has made notable contributions to algebraic number theory, group theory, and arithmetic geometry.

He attended Harvard University, earning his doctorate in 1987, under supervision of Barry Mazur. He is a Professor Emeritus at the University of Wisconsin–Madison. In 2012, he became a fellow of the American Mathematical Society.

References

External links

1961 births
Living people
20th-century American mathematicians
21st-century American mathematicians
Harvard University alumni
University of Wisconsin–Madison faculty
Fellows of the American Mathematical Society